Slasher.com is a 2016 horror feature film directed by Chip Gubera and starring Jewel Shepard, R.A. Mihailoff, All-4-One's Delious Kennedy, Ben Kaplan, and Morgan Carter.

Premise 
After meeting online, Jack and Kristy go on a weekend getaway to the woodlands of rural Missouri. While discovering each other, they soon learn of the terrorizing horrors that the forest has in store.

Awards

References

External links
 
 

2016 films
2016 horror films
American slasher films
Backwoods slasher films
2010s English-language films
2010s American films